Nieste may refer to:

 Nieste (municipality), in the district of Kassel, in Hesse, Germany
 Nieste (river), of Hesse, Germany, tributary of the Fulda